Norske Islands, ; meaning 'Norse Islands', is a group of two uninhabited islands of the Greenland Sea, Greenland.

They were named by the Denmark expedition in honor of the two Norwegian expedition members.

Geography
The Norske Islands lie near Cape Drygalsky off the coast of Lambert Land and northeast of Jokel Bay, northeastern Greenland, to the southeast of the entrance to the Nioghalvfjerd Fjord of the Nioghalvfjerdsbrae glacier. The Franske Islands lie to the south, and the Achton Friis and Schnauder Islands to the southwest. Tobias Island lies far to the northeast.

There are two main islands in the group, Store Norske, with Cape Nansen as its northernmost landhead, and a much smaller island (Lille Norske) to the south, separated from Store Norske by a narrow sound. There are also a few small islets. The group's southernmost landhead, Cape Amundsen, is located at the southern end of the smaller island.

See also
List of islands of Greenland

References

Uninhabited islands of Greenland